The Texas Review of Entertainment & Sports Law is a student-edited biannual law review at the University of Texas School of Law. It covers issues related to law that affects the entertainment and sports industries.

History 

The journal began in  1997, consisting only of student notes included as a supplement to The State Bar of Texas Entertainment and Sports Law Journal, published by the Entertainment and Sports Law Section of the State Bar of Texas. It became an independent journal in 2000.

Symposia 
On March 25, 2010, the journal held its first annual symposium. The subject was the expiring collective bargaining agreements in the National Basketball Association and the National Football League.

References

External links 
 
 The State Bar of Texas Entertainment and Sports Law Section website

American law journals
University of Texas at Austin
Publications established in 2000
Biannual journals
English-language journals
Entertainment law
Entertainment law journals
Law journals edited by students